Sean Gehon (born 1985 in Winnipeg, Manitoba) is a Canadian television personality who resides in Vancouver, British Columbia. Gehon worked as a video store employee until joining MuchMusic VJ Search ending as the first runner-up — and the only openly gay contestant — in the 2006 series that was won by Tim Deegan.

Gehon subsequently joined MuchMusic's sister channel Star! as an entertainment reporter for the entertainment magazine Star! Daily. He also hosted Best! Movies! Ever!.

References

External links

Official Sean Gehon Twitter Account

Canadian LGBT entertainers
Living people
1985 births
People from Winnipeg
Canadian LGBT broadcasters
Gay entertainers
Canadian VJs (media personalities)
Canadian gay men